Max Adler (May 12, 1866 – November 4, 1952) was born in Elgin, Illinois, to a German Jewish family that emigrated to America in about 1850. He was raised in Elgin and graduated from Elgin High School. As an adult, he was a concert violinist in Chicago before he gave up music to become a vice president at Sears Roebuck & Co. after marrying into the family that controlled the company. His wife was Sophie Rosenwald, the sister of Julius Rosenwald, who founded Chicago's Museum of Science and Industry. He retired in 1928 to become a philanthropist and was key to the creation of the first planetarium in the Western Hemisphere, the Adler Planetarium in Chicago, which bears his name.

In 1914, he had a 12,000 square foot mansion built as his house.

References

1866 births
1952 deaths
People from Elgin, Illinois
American people of German-Jewish descent
Jews and Judaism in Chicago
Museum founders
Businesspeople from Chicago